Megachile pallorea is a species of bee in the family Megachilidae. It was described by Vachal in 1903.

References

Pallorea
Insects described in 1903